Kenneth Griffith (born 14 June 1935) is a South African cricketer. He played in twelve first-class matches for Border from 1962/63 to 1964/65.

See also
 List of Border representative cricketers

References

External links
 

1935 births
Living people
South African cricketers
Border cricketers
Cricketers from East London, Eastern Cape